The Subprefecture of Vila Maria-Vila Guilherme is one of 32 subprefectures of the city of São Paulo, Brazil.  It comprises three districts: Vila Maria, Vila Guilherme, and Vila Medeiros.

This is the subprefecture where are the roads for Rio de Janeiro, Minas Gerais and the São Paulo–Guarulhos International Airport (in the neighbouring municipality of Guarulhos), thus forming an important logistic hub of the city, hosting many transport and storage companies.

References

Subprefectures of São Paulo